In Greek mythology, Corycia (Ancient Greek: Κωρύκια Korykia)  or Corycis (Kôrukis), was a naiad who lived on Mount Parnassus in Phocis.

Family 
Corycia's father was the local river-god Kephisos or Pleistos of northern Boeotia. With Apollo, she became the mother of Lycorus (Lyrcorus) who gave his name to the city Lycoreia.

Mythology 
Corycia was one of the nymphs of the springs of the Corycian Cave, which was named after her. She was related to the nymph Castalia who presided over the sacred springs at Delphi. Corycia was closely identified with Kleodora and Melaina.

The plural Coryciae was applied to the daughters of Pleistos.

Notes

References 

 Apollonius Rhodius, Argonautica translated by Robert Cooper Seaton (1853-1915), R. C. Loeb Classical Library Volume 001. London, William Heinemann Ltd, 1912. Online version at the Topos Text Project.
 Apollonius Rhodius, Argonautica. George W. Mooney. London. Longmans, Green. 1912. Greek text available at the Perseus Digital Library.
 Pausanias, Description of Greece with an English Translation by W.H.S. Jones, Litt.D., and H.A. Ormerod, M.A., in 4 Volumes. Cambridge, MA, Harvard University Press; London, William Heinemann Ltd. 1918. . Online version at the Perseus Digital Library
 Pausanias, Graeciae Descriptio. 3 vols. Leipzig, Teubner. 1903.  Greek text available at the Perseus Digital Library.
 Publius Ovidius Naso, The Epistles of Ovid. London. J. Nunn, Great-Queen-Street; R. Priestly, 143, High-Holborn; R. Lea, Greek-Street, Soho; and J. Rodwell, New-Bond-Street. 1813. Online version at the Perseus Digital Library.
 Publius Ovidius Naso. Amores, Epistulae, Medicamina faciei femineae, Ars amatoria, Remedia amoris. Edition by R. Ehwald; Rudolphi Merkelii; Leipzig. B. G. Teubner. 1907. Latin text available at the Perseus Digital Library.
 Publius Ovidius Naso, Metamorphoses translated by Brookes More (1859-1942). Boston, Cornhill Publishing Co. 1922. Online version at the Perseus Digital Library.
 Publius Ovidius Naso, Metamorphoses. Hugo Magnus. Gotha (Germany). Friedr. Andr. Perthes. 1892. Latin text available at the Perseus Digital Library.

Thriae
Naiads
Children of Potamoi
Women of Apollo
Women in Greek mythology
Phocian characters in Greek mythology
Mythology of Phocis